Chidi Dauda Omeje  (born 5 May 1990 in Enugu) is a Nigerian professional football player currently free agent.

References

External links
 Vejle Boldklub profile
Eliteprospects profile

1990 births
Living people
Nigerian footballers
Vejle Boldklub players
Danish Superliga players
Superettan players
Allsvenskan players
Expatriate men's footballers in Denmark
Expatriate footballers in Sweden
Nigerian expatriate footballers
Nigerian expatriate sportspeople in Denmark
Nigerian expatriate sportspeople in Sweden
AFC Eskilstuna players
Dalkurd FF players
GIF Sundsvall players
Association football forwards
Footballers from Enugu